Plobannalec-Lesconil is a commune in the Finistère department of Brittany in north-western France.

Population
Inhabitants of Plobannalec-Lesconil are called in French Lesconilois or Plobannalecois.

See also
Communes of the Finistère department
Entry on sculptor of local war memorial Jean Joncourt

References

External links

Official website 

Mayors of Finistère Association 

Communes of Finistère